Dimitrios "Takos" Makris (1910 – 10 March 1981) was a Greek conservative politician and close associate of Prime Minister Constantine Karamanlis.

Life
He was born in Florina, which was at the time part of the Ottoman Empire, in 1910. After graduating in Law from Athens University, he worked as a lawyer in Thessaloniki.

He served as a Member of Parliament representing Florina Prefecture from 1956 to 1967, and from 1974 to 1977. He served as Interior Minister from 1956 to 1961, and as Minister for the Presidency of the Government from 1961 to 1963.

In 1960 he was accused of being a Nazi collaborator during World War II (the so-called "Merten affair"), which he denied, but from that point onward he was constantly under attack by the press.

He died in London in 1981, aged 71.

References

1910 births
1981 deaths
20th-century Greek lawyers
National Radical Union politicians
New Democracy (Greece) politicians
Ministers of the Interior of Greece
National and Kapodistrian University of Athens alumni
Greek MPs 1956–1958
Greek MPs 1958–1961
Greek MPs 1961–1963
Greek MPs 1963–1964
Greek MPs 1964–1967
Greek MPs 1974–1977
People from Florina